Son of Mercy is the debut EP by Nigerian singer Davido. It was released by Sony Music Entertainment on October 21, 2016. The EP comprises five tracks and was produced by Shizzi, Kiddominant and Spellz. It features guest appearances from Nasty C, Simi and Tinashe. Son of Mercy tackles themes of love and combines elements of Afropop, trap, ragga, highlife and house. It was supported by the singles "Gbagbe Oshi", "How Long" and "Coolest Kid in Africa".

Background
Davido first announced plans to release the EP Son of Mercy in September 2016; he revealed its title and said it would be released on October 21. Davido recorded majority of the EP's songs in the United States. Son of Mercy was produced by Shizzi, Kiddominant and Spellz. It features collaboration with guest artists such as Nasty C, Simi and Tinashe. In an interview with Native magazine, Davido criticized Son of Mercy and said he did not select the songs that appeared on it.

Composition
The Shizzi-produced track "Gbagbe Oshi" contains lyrics recorded in pidgin, Yoruba and patois; it has a muscular beat with two significant drum breaks. The contemporary highlife track "Maga 2 Mugu" features guest vocals by Simi; Chiagoziem of Filter Free Nigeria praised Simi for bringing "calm and sappiness to Davido's hyperactivity and directness". The Spellz-produced track "How Long" contains elements of Afropop and soulful house music. In the Afrobeats-infused trap song "Coolest Kid in Africa", Davido exchanges bars with South African rapper Nasty C and brags about how saving money isn't part of his vocabulary. The highlife track "Return" focuses on themes of love and begins with an earnest admission about Davido's relationship with an unnamed woman.

Singles
The EP's lead single "Gbagbe Oshi" (Yoruba: "kill the drama" or "leave the matter") was released on October 3, 2016. The song was produced by Shizzi and released nearly 10 months after Davido signed with RCA Records/Sony Music International. The accompanying music video for "Gbagbe Oshi" premiered on October 1, in honor of Nigeria's 56th annual Independence Day.

The Tinashe-assisted track "How Long" was released on October 13, 2016, as the EP's second single. The song fuses South African house music with Yoruba lyrics and R&B elements. Davido told Vice he recorded "How Long" a year ago and agreed to put Tinashe on the record after being asked by a label executive to do so. Sabo Kpade commended Davido and Tinashe's sound and said "How Long" was a "smooth ride of a song". The visuals for "How Long" was shot in Malibu; in it, Davido arrives to the beach on a motorcycle and Tinashe on a white horse. 

The Nasty C-assisted track "Coolest Kid in Africa" was released on November 18, 2016, as the EP's third single. The accompanying music video for the song was shot and directed by Sesan Ogunro.

Critical reception

Son of Mercy received generally mixed reviews from music critics. Chiagoziem of Filter Free Nigeria said listeners who see the EP as a "collection of strategically-placed songs" would appreciate it more than those who see Davido as "one of a few African artists that record labels are telling the world could become the future of music". A writer for Pulse Nigeria awarded the EP 3.5 stars out of 5, describing it as a balanced project that is "somewhere between experimental and familiar, but weirdly satisfying". Sabo Kpade of OkayAfrica said Simi's voice on "Maga 2 Mugu" lacks presence despite being pleasant. Kpade criticized "Return" for lacking "a clean thematic consistency".

Track listing

Charts

Release history

References

2016 debut EPs
Davido albums
Albums produced by Shizzi
Albums produced by Kiddominant
Albums produced by Spellz